A quasi-Hilda comet (QHC) is a Jupiter-family comet that interacts strongly with Jupiter and undergoes extended temporary capture by it. These comets are associated with the Hilda asteroid zone in the 3:2 inner mean-motion resonance with Jupiter. Typically, asteroids in this zone have a semimajor axis between 3.70 and 4.20 AU, eccentricities below 0.30, and inclinations of no more than 20°. Comets can be temporarily perturbed into this group and then perturbed back out again. Eight percent of the comets that leave the 3:2 resonance end up impacting Jupiter.

Known quasi-Hilda comets
These numbered comets belong to the group of quasi-Hilda comet:

39P/Oterma was a quasi-Hilda before a close approach to Jupiter in 1963. 77P/Longmore falls outside of the bulk distribution because of its large eccentricity and inclination. Comet Shoemaker–Levy 9 impacted with Jupiter in 1994.

A not numbered comet claimed to be quasi-Hilda object with comet activity is P/2010 H2 (Vales).

References

Comets
Jupiter